Caledon is a small village and townland (of 232 acres) in County Tyrone, Northern Ireland. It is in the Clogher Valley on the banks of the River Blackwater, 10 km from Armagh. It lies in the southeast of Tyrone and near the borders of County Armagh and County Monaghan. It is situated in the historic barony of Dungannon Lower and the civil parish of Aghaloo. In the 2001 Census it had a population of 387 people. It is a designated conservation area. It was historically known as Kinnaird (Irish: Cionn Aird, meaning "head/top  of the height or hill".

History
The old settlement of Kinard was burned in 1608 by the forces of Sir Cahir O'Doherty during O'Doherty's Rebellion. Sir Henry Óg O'Neill, the main local landowner, was killed by the rebels.

In 1967 the Gildernew family, began a protest about discrimination in housing allocation by 'squatting' (illegally occupying) in a house in Caledon. The house had been allocated by Dungannon Rural District Council to a 19-year-old unmarried Ulster Protestant woman, Emily Beattie, who was the secretary of a local Ulster Unionist Party politician. Beattie was given the house ahead of older married Catholic families with children. The protesters were evicted by officers of the Royal Ulster Constabulary, one of whom was Beattie's brother. The next day, the annual conference of the Nationalist Party unanimously approved of the protest action by Currie.

Caledon House

Caledon House was built in 1779 by James Alexander, a member of the Irish House of Commons for Londonderry, who had previously in 1778 bought the Caledon Estate. James Alexander was made Baron Caledon in 1790 and later Viscount Caledon in 1797. The House was begun in 1779 to designs by Thomas Cooley, but altered by John Nash in 1808–10.

Transport
Caledon railway station (on the narrow gauge Clogher Valley Railway) opened on 2 May 1887, but finally closed on 1 January 1942. Tynan and Caledon railway station on the mainline opened by the Ulster Railway on 25 May 1858.  In 1876 the Ulster Railway merged with other railways companies to become the Great Northern Railway (Ireland).  The station was finally closed on 1 October 1957.

Education
Local schools include Churchill Primary School and St. Joseph's Primary School.

Demography

19th century population
The population of the village decreased during the 19th century:

21st century population
On Census day (29 April 2001) there were 387 people living in Caledon. Of these:
31.0% were under 16 years old and 16.2% were aged 60 and over;
47.9% of the population were male and 52.1% were female;
35.1% were from a Catholic community background
60.0% were from a 'Protestant and Other Christian (including Christian related)' community background.

Caledon townland

The village of Caledon is in a townland of the same name. The townland is situated in the historic barony of Dungannon Lower and the civil parish of Aghaloo and covers an area of 232 acres. The population of the townland declined during the 19th century:

The townland contains one Scheduled Historic Monument: a Beam engine (grid ref: H7581 4521).

People
 The village is home to the Earl of Caledon and the Alexander family as well as previously being home to Felim O'Neill, the leader of the Irish Rebellion of 1641.
 John Foster McCreight (1827-1913) was a jurist and the first Premier of the Canadian province of British Columbia. He was born in Caledon to a well-established and well-connected family.
 Brian McCoy (1942 – 1975), was a trumpet player with the Miami Showband. McCoy was one of the three band members killed when the group was ambushed at a bogus military checkpoint outside Newry by the Glenanne gang, an outfit composed of loyalist paramilitary, RUC officers, and members of the British military and security services.

References

External links

 Caledon Village website
 Lewis's Topographical Dictionary, 1837
 Lewis's Topographical Dictionary, 1842

Villages in County Tyrone
Townlands of County Tyrone
Civil parish of Aghaloo